The Kentucky Standard is the local newspaper of Bardstown, Kentucky.

History
The Kentucky Standard was started December 15, 1900 by Jack Wilson, a former employee of the Nelson County Record. The newspaper was sold to Nelson County Circuit Clerk Wallace Brown in 1901. The former owner still contributed as an editor for the paper. In 1919, Alfred S. Wathen bought enough stocks of the company to become the newspaper's publisher. In 1958, Alfred S. Wathen's children began running the newspaper. In 1979, the newspaper was bought by Scripps Howard. The most recent transfer of ownership was in April 1987 when Landmark Community Newspapers bought the newspaper.

The Kentucky Standard Today
The Kentucky Standard is today published two times a week. The newspaper also runs PLG-TV, a local cable TV channel, three websites, and a classified magazine about real estate.

See also

References

External links
The Kentucky Standard Official Website
The Kentucky Standard's Publisher - Landmark Community Newspapers, Inc 

Bardstown, Kentucky
Newspapers published in Kentucky
Publications established in 1900
1900 establishments in Kentucky